Yolk was a quarterly magazine for young Asian Americans. It was published by InformAsian Media, Inc. (IAMI) between 1994 and 2004, and it was headquartered in Alhambra, California, in Greater Los Angeles. The later incarnations of the magazine were titled Yolk: GenerAsian Next 2.0.

History and content 
It was founded in 1994 by Tommy Tam, Tin Yen, and Amy Lee Tu. Tommy Tam was in charge of operations, Tin Yen was the graphic designer/art director, and Amy Tu oversaw the financial aspects of the magazine.

Based in Los Angeles, Yolks reflection of its generation combines sections on fashion, entertainment and music, book reviews, with occasional in-your-face attacks on our society's misunderstandings of Asian culture. The magazine's premise is that there is something common to Japanese, Korean and Chinese Americans, as well as Vietnamese, Filipinos, Indians and other Asian American groups.

Yolks first editor was Philip Chung, and managing editor, Larry Tazuma, came up with the magazine's name. "An egg yolk is yellow," he said," and so is the nominal color of Asian people's skin, regardless of nationality." "YOLK draws a strong reaction. But it simply stands for the color of our skin," he says. "It's what connects all Asians."  Performance artist and professor Alex Luu served as its editor and graphic designer Max Medina/Mystery Parade served as the Art Designer of YOLK. Staff writers include XD Lim and Margaret Rhee.

As the business grew, operations expanded into the clothing business. YOLK was well known for producing its line of Got Rice? t-shirts under the Brand Fury name. Popular sellers included phrases such as Got Rice?, Got Sushi?, Got Adobo? and Got Pho?

Circulation reached a high of 50,000 in 2000 and targeted English-fluent college-educated Asian Americans coming from various cultures. In 2001, Stanley Lim came in as the new publisher of the magazine. He proposed a new formula heavy on "guy stuff"—reviews of video games and tech gadgets, interviews with models and more bikini-clad women, both on the cover and throughout the pages. But Yolk was not able to sustain success, and folded in 2004 after a 10-year, 31-issue run.

Tommy Tam is currently the VP of Marketing at Dream Tube Entertainment. Tin Yen is still involved with graphic design today and has taught at UCLA Extension in the graphic design program. He founded creative agency TYS Creative, Inc. Amy Lee Tu is currently the Head of Marketing at Indomina Releasing.

As Yolk was closing, Honda Motor Co. offered a four month advertising contract. Lim and the editorial staff changed the publication into a web publication, and asked Honda to provide online advertising banners in lieu of print advertisements. Honda agreed to the change, and Chopblock.com became active.

Issues list
The cover subjects have been well-known celebrities and other notable Asian Americans in the Entertainment field.

No. 01 - Margaret Cho
No. 02 - Russell Wong
No. 03 - Dean Cain
No. 04 - Ming-Na Wen
No. 05 - Kiana Tom
No. 06 - Michelle Yeoh
No. 07 - Jim Lee
No. 08 - Shannon Lee
No. 09 - Sung Hi Lee
No. 10 - Jet Li
No. 11 - Adam Saruwatari
No. 12 - Bai Ling
No. 13 - Doug Chiang
No. 14 - Sammo Hung
No. 15 - Audrey Quock
No. 16 - Lauren Tom
No. 17 - Kelly Hu
No. 18 - Stacy Kamano
No. 19 - Nicole Bilderback
No. 20 - Karen Kim
No. 21 - Michelle Krusiec
No. 22 - Jodi Ann Paterson
No. 23 - Marie Matiko
No. 24 - Dwayne Johnson aka "The Rock"
No. 25 - Kiana Tom
No. 26 - Joy Bisco
No. 27 - Linda Park
No. 28 - Lexa Doig
No. 29 - Jimi Mistry
No. 30 - John Cho
No. 31 - Sanoe Lake

See also 

Asian Pride
Asian American
 A. Magazine
Model Minority#Asian Americans

References
 Wong, Deborah. "GenerAsians Learn Chinese: The Asian American Youth Generation and New Class Formations." in DiMaggio, Paul and Patricia Fernandez-Kelly (editors). "Art in the Lives of Immigrant Communities in the United States." Rutgers University Press, November 18, 2010. , 9780813547572.

Notes

Further reading
Cacas, Samuel R. and Gary Cach. "Yolk: A Sizzle of Fizzle for Twentysomething?." AsianWeek. October 7, 1994.
Johnston, George. "YOLK-IT'S NO JOKE." The Rafu Shimpo. Wednesday September 28, 1994.
Tazuma, Larry J. "Second Opinion / OTHER MEDIA : YOLK : How an Asian American Magazine Got Its Name." Los Angeles Times. October 17, 1994. From an editorial printed in the first issue of Yolk. Alternate link
Song, Betty. "Asian Yolk takes crack at wider readership Ex-Bruin's magazine scrambles to move 'generAsians' into multiethnic culture." The Daily Bruin. University of California, Los Angeles. Monday January 5, 1995.
"Ethnic 'Zine." Folio: The Magazine for Magazine Management. May 1, 1995.
"Mellow Yellow." USA Today. Thursday October 3, 1995. Life Section D. Section D Life.
"'New generAsian' target of USC alum's magazine Yolk, brainchild of 1991 graduate Tommy Tam, bridges spectrum." Daily Trojan. October 3, 1994.
"SLICKS FOR SLACKERS." The Oregonian. November 29, 1994.

External links
 New Amped Asia - Asian American magazine (successor)
 Yolk magazine (archive)
 Yolk Shop (archive)
 Informasian Media Group
 Chopblock.com, successor to Yolk
 Dream Tube Entertainment
 TYS Creative
 Indomina Releasing

Alhambra, California
Cultural magazines published in the United States
Entertainment magazines published in the United States
Quarterly magazines published in the United States
Asian-American culture in California
Asian-American magazines
Defunct magazines published in the United States
Magazines established in 1994
Magazines disestablished in 2004
Magazines published in California